The 1971 VFL season was the 75th season of the Victorian Football League (VFL), the highest level senior Australian rules football competition in Victoria. The season featured twelve clubs, ran from 3 April until 25 September, and comprised a 22-game home-and-away season followed by a finals series featuring the top four clubs.

The premiership was won by the Hawthorn Football Club for the second time, after it defeated  by seven points in the 1971 VFL Grand Final. Hawthorn full-forward Peter Hudson kicked 150 goals for the season, equalling the all-time record set by Bob Pratt in 1934.

Premiership season
In 1971, the VFL competition consisted of twelve teams of 18 on-the-field players each, plus two substitute players, known as the 19th man and the 20th man. A player could be substituted for any reason; however, once substituted, a player could not return to the field of play under any circumstances.

Teams played each other in a home-and-away season of 22 rounds; matches 12 to 22 were the "home-and-way reverse" of matches 1 to 11.

Once the 22 round home-and-away season had finished, the 1971 VFL Premiers were determined by the specific format and conventions of the Page–McIntyre system.

Round 1

|- bgcolor="#CCCCFF"
| Home team
| Home team score
| Away team
| Away team score
| Venue
| Crowd
| Date
|- bgcolor="#FFFFFF"
| 
| 24.21 (165)
| 
| 7.18 (60)
| MCG
| 28,727
| 3 April 1971
|- bgcolor="#FFFFFF"
| 
| 8.9 (57)
| 
| 21.25 (151)
| Kardinia Park
| 20,771
| 3 April 1971
|- bgcolor="#FFFFFF"
| 
| 14.15 (99)
| 
| 22.18 (150)
| Junction Oval
| 18,386
| 3 April 1971
|- bgcolor="#FFFFFF"
| 
| 10.12 (72)
| 
| 13.18 (96)
| Windy Hill
| 19,214
| 3 April 1971
|- bgcolor="#FFFFFF"
| 
| 25.10 (160)
| 
| 11.11 (77)
| Victoria Park
| 27,829
| 3 April 1971
|- bgcolor="#FFFFFF"
| 
| 18.16 (124)
| 
| 14.14 (98)
| Arden Street Oval
| 20,399
| 3 April 1971

Round 2

|- bgcolor="#CCCCFF"
| Home team
| Home team score
| Away team
| Away team score
| Venue
| Crowd
| Date
|- bgcolor="#FFFFFF"
| 
| 20.9 (129)
| 
| 9.15 (69)
| Princes Park
| 30,480
| 10 April 1971
|- bgcolor="#FFFFFF"
| 
| 12.20 (92)
| 
| 16.14 (110)
| Lake Oval
| 17,090
| 10 April 1971
|- bgcolor="#FFFFFF"
| 
| 14.13 (97)
| 
| 7.11 (53)
| Glenferrie Oval
| 15,310
| 10 April 1971
|- bgcolor="#FFFFFF"
| 
| 8.15 (63)
| 
| 16.11 (107)
| Western Oval
| 20,378
| 12 April 1971
|- bgcolor="#FFFFFF"
| 
| 16.12 (108)
| 
| 12.8 (80)
| Moorabbin Oval
| 24,174
| 12 April 1971
|- bgcolor="#FFFFFF"
| 
| 10.9 (69)
| 
| 16.10 (106)
| MCG
| 82,172
| 12 April 1971

Round 3

|- bgcolor="#CCCCFF"
| Home team
| Home team score
| Away team
| Away team score
| Venue
| Crowd
| Date
|- bgcolor="#FFFFFF"
| 
| 14.15 (99)
| 
| 14.9 (93)
| Western Oval
| 15,003
| 17 April 1971
|- bgcolor="#FFFFFF"
| 
| 17.26 (128)
| 
| 14.10 (94)
| Junction Oval
| 8,917
| 17 April 1971
|- bgcolor="#FFFFFF"
| 
| 16.19 (115)
| 
| 16.11 (107)
| Glenferrie Oval
| 14,090
| 17 April 1971
|- bgcolor="#FFFFFF"
| 
| 9.12 (66)
| 
| 9.12 (66)
| Windy Hill
| 22,421
| 17 April 1971
|- bgcolor="#FFFFFF"
| 
| 19.13 (127)
| 
| 15.10 (100)
| MCG
| 42,885
| 17 April 1971
|- bgcolor="#FFFFFF"
| 
| 10.8 (68)
| 
| 6.13 (49)
| VFL Park
| 33,489
| 17 April 1971

Round 4

|- bgcolor="#CCCCFF"
| Home team
| Home team score
| Away team
| Away team score
| Venue
| Crowd
| Date
|- bgcolor="#FFFFFF"
| 
| 19.20 (134)
| 
| 12.9 (81)
| Victoria Park
| 25,759
| 24 April 1971
|- bgcolor="#FFFFFF"
| 
| 5.9 (39)
| 
| 20.13 (133)
| Lake Oval
| 18,895
| 24 April 1971
|- bgcolor="#FFFFFF"
| 
| 10.9 (69)
| 
| 18.19 (127)
| Moorabbin Oval
| 25,153
| 24 April 1971
|- bgcolor="#FFFFFF"
| 
| 14.15 (99)
| 
| 13.14 (92)
| Arden Street Oval
| 13,972
| 24 April 1971
|- bgcolor="#FFFFFF"
| 
| 13.8 (86)
| 
| 13.21 (99)
| Kardinia Park
| 23,555
| 24 April 1971
|- bgcolor="#FFFFFF"
| 
| 10.18 (78)
| 
| 6.7 (43)
| VFL Park
| 27,342
| 24 April 1971

Round 5

|- bgcolor="#CCCCFF"
| Home team
| Home team score
| Away team
| Away team score
| Venue
| Crowd
| Date
|- bgcolor="#FFFFFF"
| 
| 14.8 (92)
| 
| 17.18 (120)
| Junction Oval
| 12,363
| 1 May 1971
|- bgcolor="#FFFFFF"
| 
| 21.15 (141)
| 
| 16.12 (108)
| Windy Hill
| 16,435
| 1 May 1971
|- bgcolor="#FFFFFF"
| 
| 16.15 (111)
| 
| 10.11 (71)
| Victoria Park
| 22,546
| 1 May 1971
|- bgcolor="#FFFFFF"
| 
| 13.18 (96)
| 
| 11.17 (83)
| Princes Park
| 24,027
| 1 May 1971
|- bgcolor="#FFFFFF"
| 
| 14.17 (101)
| 
| 17.19 (121)
| MCG
| 23,758
| 1 May 1971
|- bgcolor="#FFFFFF"
| 
| 12.21 (93)
| 
| 6.9 (45)
| VFL Park
| 16,206
| 1 May 1971

Round 6

|- bgcolor="#CCCCFF"
| Home team
| Home team score
| Away team
| Away team score
| Venue
| Crowd
| Date
|- bgcolor="#FFFFFF"
| 
| 12.12 (84)
| 
| 22.14 (146)
| Arden Street Oval
| 13,047
| 8 May 1971
|- bgcolor="#FFFFFF"
| 
| 18.5 (113)
| 
| 16.11 (107)
| Western Oval
| 19,205
| 8 May 1971
|- bgcolor="#FFFFFF"
| 
| 14.25 (109)
| 
| 9.11 (65)
| Moorabbin Oval
| 21,604
| 8 May 1971
|- bgcolor="#FFFFFF"
| 
| 10.12 (72)
| 
| 18.19 (127)
| MCG
| 80,231
| 8 May 1971
|- bgcolor="#FFFFFF"
| 
| 13.14 (92)
| 
| 14.10 (94)
| Lake Oval
| 17,171
| 8 May 1971
|- bgcolor="#FFFFFF"
| 
| 13.13 (91)
| 
| 20.16 (136)
| VFL Park
| 11,432
| 8 May 1971

Round 7

|- bgcolor="#CCCCFF"
| Home team
| Home team score
| Away team
| Away team score
| Venue
| Crowd
| Date
|- bgcolor="#FFFFFF"
| 
| 22.17 (149)
| 
| 15.14 (104)
| MCG
| 21,069
| 15 May 1971
|- bgcolor="#FFFFFF"
| 
| 21.19 (145)
| 
| 12.6 (78)
| Glenferrie Oval
| 22,956
| 15 May 1971
|- bgcolor="#FFFFFF"
| 
| 11.16 (82)
| 
| 13.14 (92)
| Junction Oval
| 17,573
| 15 May 1971
|- bgcolor="#FFFFFF"
| 
| 12.17 (89)
| 
| 16.9 (105)
| Windy Hill
| 17,055
| 15 May 1971
|- bgcolor="#FFFFFF"
| 
| 15.16 (106)
| 
| 14.8 (92)
| Victoria Park
| 25,525
| 15 May 1971
|- bgcolor="#FFFFFF"
| 
| 12.19 (91)
| 
| 11.13 (79)
| VFL Park
| 29,195
| 15 May 1971

Round 8

|- bgcolor="#CCCCFF"
| Home team
| Home team score
| Away team
| Away team score
| Venue
| Crowd
| Date
|- bgcolor="#FFFFFF"
| 
| 10.12 (72)
| 
| 14.22 (106)
| Kardinia Park
| 20,247
| 22 May 1971
|- bgcolor="#FFFFFF"
| 
| 13.11 (89)
| 
| 19.19 (133)
| Lake Oval
| 15,147
| 22 May 1971
|- bgcolor="#FFFFFF"
| 
| 17.17 (119)
| 
| 12.7 (79)
| Western Oval
| 21,295
| 22 May 1971
|- bgcolor="#FFFFFF"
| 
| 20.15 (135)
| 
| 13.10 (88)
| Moorabbin Oval
| 38,127
| 22 May 1971
|- bgcolor="#FFFFFF"
| 
| 16.26 (122)
| 
| 9.16 (70)
| MCG
| 52,783
| 22 May 1971
|- bgcolor="#FFFFFF"
| 
| 7.10 (52)
| 
| 22.15 (147)
| VFL Park
| 14,860
| 22 May 1971

Round 9

|- bgcolor="#CCCCFF"
| Home team
| Home team score
| Away team
| Away team score
| Venue
| Crowd
| Date
|- bgcolor="#FFFFFF"
| 
| 10.10 (70)
| 
| 10.7 (67)
| MCG
| 39,380
| 29 May 1971
|- bgcolor="#FFFFFF"
| 
| 17.17 (119)
| 
| 10.18 (78)
| Junction Oval
| 12,255
| 29 May 1971
|- bgcolor="#FFFFFF"
| 
| 15.10 (100)
| 
| 10.6 (66)
| Victoria Park
| 20,350
| 29 May 1971
|- bgcolor="#FFFFFF"
| 
| 4.12 (36)
| 
| 14.12 (96)
| Princes Park
| 29,250
| 29 May 1971
|- bgcolor="#FFFFFF"
| 
| 16.28 (124)
| 
| 16.13 (109)
| Arden Street Oval
| 7,335
| 29 May 1971
|- bgcolor="#FFFFFF"
| 
| 13.11 (89)
| 
| 17.11 (113)
| VFL Park
| 16,300
| 29 May 1971

Round 10

|- bgcolor="#CCCCFF"
| Home team
| Home team score
| Away team
| Away team score
| Venue
| Crowd
| Date
|- bgcolor="#FFFFFF"
| 
| 13.18 (96)
| 
| 8.15 (63)
| Windy Hill
| 14,864
| 5 June 1971
|- bgcolor="#FFFFFF"
| 
| 13.12 (90)
| 
| 10.15 (75)
| Princes Park
| 24,000
| 5 June 1971
|- bgcolor="#FFFFFF"
| 
| 9.6 (60)
| 
| 18.23 (131)
| Lake Oval
| 16,069
| 5 June 1971
|- bgcolor="#FFFFFF"
| 
| 15.16 (106)
| 
| 11.9 (75)
| MCG
| 48,708
| 5 June 1971
|- bgcolor="#FFFFFF"
| 
| 15.17 (107)
| 
| 7.13 (55)
| Glenferrie Oval
| 28,450
| 5 June 1971
|- bgcolor="#FFFFFF"
| 
| 19.10 (124)
| 
| 18.14 (122)
| VFL Park
| 11,673
| 5 June 1971

Round 11

|- bgcolor="#CCCCFF"
| Home team
| Home team score
| Away team
| Away team score
| Venue
| Crowd
| Date
|- bgcolor="#FFFFFF"
| 
| 12.17 (89)
| 
| 13.20 (98)
| Arden Street Oval
| 9,454
| 14 June 1971
|- bgcolor="#FFFFFF"
| 
| 12.11 (83)
| 
| 20.13 (133)
| Kardinia Park
| 23,388
| 14 June 1971
|- bgcolor="#FFFFFF"
| 
| 10.14 (74)
| 
| 14.10 (94)
| MCG
| 52,256
| 14 June 1971
|- bgcolor="#FFFFFF"
| 
| 17.16 (118)
| 
| 9.5 (59)
| Moorabbin Oval
| 22,488
| 14 June 1971
|- bgcolor="#FFFFFF"
| 
| 17.13 (115)
| 
| 8.9 (57)
| Junction Oval
| 14,212
| 14 June 1971
|- bgcolor="#FFFFFF"
| 
| 24.14 (158)
| 
| 11.7 (73)
| VFL Park
| 50,246
| 14 June 1971

Round 12

|- bgcolor="#CCCCFF"
| Home team
| Home team score
| Away team
| Away team score
| Venue
| Crowd
| Date
|- bgcolor="#FFFFFF"
| 
| 16.18 (114)
| 
| 3.5 (23)
| Princes Park
| 13,300
| 19 June 1971
|- bgcolor="#FFFFFF"
| 
| 14.15 (99)
| 
| 3.3 (21)
| Moorabbin Oval
| 14,181
| 19 June 1971
|- bgcolor="#FFFFFF"
| 
| 6.11 (47)
| 
| 8.17 (65)
| MCG
| 24,831
| 19 June 1971
|- bgcolor="#FFFFFF"
| 
| 14.20 (104)
| 
| 11.5 (71)
| Glenferrie Oval
| 14,181
| 19 June 1971
|- bgcolor="#FFFFFF"
| 
| 8.15 (63)
| 
| 6.10 (46)
| Western Oval
| 21,188
| 19 June 1971
|- bgcolor="#FFFFFF"
| 
| 2.6 (18)
| 
| 6.13 (49)
| VFL Park
| 12,528
| 19 June 1971

Round 13

|- bgcolor="#CCCCFF"
| Home team
| Home team score
| Away team
| Away team score
| Venue
| Crowd
| Date
|- bgcolor="#FFFFFF"
| 
| 6.16 (52)
| 
| 16.15 (111)
| Arden Street Oval
| 8,508
| 26 June 1971
|- bgcolor="#FFFFFF"
| 
| 13.9 (87)
| 
| 9.12 (66)
| Kardinia Park
| 11,222
| 26 June 1971
|- bgcolor="#FFFFFF"
| 
| 18.16 (124)
| 
| 12.12 (84)
| Victoria Park
| 33,338
| 26 June 1971
|- bgcolor="#FFFFFF"
| 
| 11.13 (79)
| 
| 12.8 (80)
| MCG
| 28,471
| 26 June 1971
|- bgcolor="#FFFFFF"
| 
| 13.6 (84)
| 
| 14.14 (98)
| Windy Hill
| 18,853
| 26 June 1971
|- bgcolor="#FFFFFF"
| 
| 7.16 (58)
| 
| 14.9 (93)
| VFL Park
| 18,369
| 26 June 1971

Round 14

|- bgcolor="#CCCCFF"
| Home team
| Home team score
| Away team
| Away team score
| Venue
| Crowd
| Date
|- bgcolor="#FFFFFF"
| 
| 13.6 (84)
| 
| 15.13 (103)
| Kardinia Park
| 14,283
| 3 July 1971
|- bgcolor="#FFFFFF"
| 
| 30.20 (200)
| 
| 7.11 (53)
| Victoria Park
| 26,831
| 3 July 1971
|- bgcolor="#FFFFFF"
| 
| 13.9 (87)
| 
| 13.12 (90)
| Moorabbin Oval
| 28,825
| 3 July 1971
|- bgcolor="#FFFFFF"
| 
| 18.15 (123)
| 
| 19.11 (125)
| Lake Oval
| 13,360
| 3 July 1971
|- bgcolor="#FFFFFF"
| 
| 13.11 (89)
| 
| 11.16 (82)
| Arden Street Oval
| 8,777
| 3 July 1971
|- bgcolor="#FFFFFF"
| 
| 12.16 (88)
| 
| 11.6 (72)
| VFL Park
| 27,511
| 3 July 1971

Round 15

|- bgcolor="#CCCCFF"
| Home team
| Home team score
| Away team
| Away team score
| Venue
| Crowd
| Date
|- bgcolor="#FFFFFF"
| 
| 12.18 (90)
| 
| 11.13 (79)
| MCG
| 22,870
| 10 July 1971
|- bgcolor="#FFFFFF"
| 
| 20.5 (125)
| 
| 15.12 (102)
| Glenferrie Oval
| 21,647
| 10 July 1971
|- bgcolor="#FFFFFF"
| 
| 11.12 (78)
| 
| 12.17 (89)
| Windy Hill
| 14,093
| 10 July 1971
|- bgcolor="#FFFFFF"
| 
| 21.15 (141)
| 
| 15.14 (104)
| Princes Park
| 21,000
| 10 July 1971
|- bgcolor="#FFFFFF"
| 
| 11.18 (84)
| 
| 16.6 (102)
| Junction Oval
| 24,926
| 10 July 1971
|- bgcolor="#FFFFFF"
| 
| 22.31 (163)
| 
| 11.5 (71)
| VFL Park
| 10,075
| 10 July 1971

Round 16

|- bgcolor="#CCCCFF"
| Home team
| Home team score
| Away team
| Away team score
| Venue
| Crowd
| Bernard
|- bgcolor="#FFFFFF"
| | 13.8 (86)| 
| 6.15 (51)
| Western Oval
| 17,826
| 17 July 1971
|- bgcolor="#FFFFFF"
| 
| 3.15 (33)
| | 11.16 (82)| Lake Oval
| 10,519
| 17 July 1971
|- bgcolor="#FFFFFF"
| 
| 4.10 (34)
| | 7.7 (49)| MCG
| 20,013
| 17 July 1971
|- bgcolor="#FFFFFF"
| 
| 6.9 (45)
| | 8.12 (60)| Arden Street Oval
| 9,835
| 17 July 1971
|- bgcolor="#FFFFFF"
| | 13.19 (97)| 
| 8.6 (54)
| Moorabbin Oval
| 25,518
| 17 July 1971
|- bgcolor="#FFFFFF"
| 
| 13.7 (85)
| 
| 16.18 (114)
| VFL Park
| 9,012
| 17 July 1971

Round 17

|- bgcolor="#CCCCFF"
| Home team| Home team score| Away team| Away team score| Venue| Crowd| Date|- bgcolor="#FFFFFF"
| | 20.19 (139)| 
| 11.10 (76)
| Junction Oval
| 8,889
| 24 July 1971
|- bgcolor="#FFFFFF"
| 
| 7.8 (50)
| | 14.15 (99)| Windy Hill
| 15,273
| 24 July 1971
|- bgcolor="#FFFFFF"
| | 12.12 (84)| 
| 11.12 (78)
| Victoria Park
| 27,243
| 24 July 1971
|- bgcolor="#FFFFFF"
| | 24.16 (160)| 
| 11.7 (73)
| Princes Park
| 16,500
| 24 July 1971
|- bgcolor="#FFFFFF"
| | 23.16 (154)| 
| 4.15 (39)
| Glenferrie Oval
| 21,059
| 24 July 1971
|- bgcolor="#FFFFFF"
| | 25.19 (169)| 
| 12.7 (79)
| VFL Park
| 11,416
| 24 July 1971

Round 18

|- bgcolor="#CCCCFF"
| Home team| Home team score| Away team| Away team score| Venue| Crowd| Date|- bgcolor="#FFFFFF"
| | 8.14 (62)| | 9.8 (62)| Arden Street Oval
| 6,522
| 31 July 1971
|- bgcolor="#FFFFFF"
| | 16.12 (108)| 
| 11.10 (76)
| MCG
| 47,951
| 31 July 1971
|- bgcolor="#FFFFFF"
| 
| 13.8 (86)
| | 13.18 (96)| Lake Oval
| 7,895
| 31 July 1971
|- bgcolor="#FFFFFF"
| | 21.11 (137)| 
| 19.14 (128)
| Kardinia Park
| 22,000
| 31 July 1971
|- bgcolor="#FFFFFF"
| 
| 11.10 (76)
| | 15.16 (106)| Western Oval
| 21,670
| 31 July 1971
|- bgcolor="#FFFFFF"
| | 13.5 (83)| 
| 9.10 (64)
| VFL Park
| 14,563
| 31 July 1971

Round 19

|- bgcolor="#CCCCFF"
| Home team| Home team score| Away team| Away team score| Venue| Crowd| Date|- bgcolor="#FFFFFF"
| | 23.16 (154)| 
| 9.8 (62)
| Glenferrie Oval
| 9,112
| 7 August 1971
|- bgcolor="#FFFFFF"
| | 11.17 (83)| 
| 8.10 (58)
| Junction Oval
| 8,253
| 7 August 1971
|- bgcolor="#FFFFFF"
| 
| 7.23 (65)
| | 9.12 (66)| Windy Hill
| 13,815
| 7 August 1971
|- bgcolor="#FFFFFF"
| 
| 8.10 (58)
| | 14.17 (101)| Princes Park
| 34,224
| 7 August 1971
|- bgcolor="#FFFFFF"
| | 18.17 (125)| 
| 9.8 (62)
| MCG
| 23,017
| 7 August 1971
|- bgcolor="#FFFFFF"
| 
| 8.10 (58)
| 
| 12.7 (79)
| VFL Park
| 46,362
| 7 August 1971

Round 20

|- bgcolor="#CCCCFF"
| Home team| Home team score| Away team| Away team score| Venue| Crowd| Date|- bgcolor="#FFFFFF"
| | 24.7 (151)| 
| 11.10 (76)
| Kardinia Park
| 12,085
| 14 August 1971
|- bgcolor="#FFFFFF"
| | 14.11 (95)| 
| 9.10 (64)
| Moorabbin Oval
| 25,081
| 14 August 1971
|- bgcolor="#FFFFFF"
| 
| 11.9 (75)
| | 15.20 (110)| Western Oval
| 15,096
| 14 August 1971
|- bgcolor="#FFFFFF"
| | 18.18 (126)| 
| 10.12 (72)
| MCG
| 28,388
| 14 August 1971
|- bgcolor="#FFFFFF"
| 
| 11.15 (81)
| | 19.6 (120)| Glenferrie Oval
| 22,753
| 14 August 1971
|- bgcolor="#FFFFFF"
| 
| 9.8 (62)
| 
| 18.18 (126)
| VFL Park
| 19,491
| 14 August 1971

Round 21

|- bgcolor="#CCCCFF"
| Home team| Home team score| Away team| Away team score| Venue| Crowd| Date|- bgcolor="#FFFFFF"
| | 18.14 (122)| 
| 6.14 (50)
| Moorabbin Oval
| 16,205
| 21 August 1971
|- bgcolor="#FFFFFF"
| 
| 15.12 (102)
| | 19.9 (123)| MCG
| 37,732
| 21 August 1971
|- bgcolor="#FFFFFF"
| 
| 15.15 (105)
| | 20.20 (140)| Victoria Park
| 41,312
| 21 August 1971
|- bgcolor="#FFFFFF"
| | 18.18 (126)| 
| 15.5 (95)
| Kardinia Park
| 17,864
| 21 August 1971
|- bgcolor="#FFFFFF"
| | 15.13 (103)| 
| 10.12 (72)
| Arden Street Oval
| 8,733
| 21 August 1971
|- bgcolor="#FFFFFF"
| | 15.15 (105)| 
| 11.16 (82)
| Junction Oval
| 22,413
| 21 August 1971

Round 22

|- bgcolor="#CCCCFF"
| Home team| Home team score| Away team| Away team score| Venue| Crowd| Date|- bgcolor="#FFFFFF"
| | 18.16 (124)| 
| 8.17 (65)
| Glenferrie Oval
| 14,809
| 28 August 1971
|- bgcolor="#FFFFFF"
| 
| 10.14 (74)
| | 12.18 (90)| Western Oval
| 16,707
| 28 August 1971
|- bgcolor="#FFFFFF"
| 
| 12.12 (84)
| | 13.17 (95)| Windy Hill
| 12,865
| 28 August 1971
|- bgcolor="#FFFFFF"
| | 16.10 (106)| 
| 13.9 (87)
| Princes Park
| 32,000
| 28 August 1971
|- bgcolor="#FFFFFF"
| | 19.17 (131)| 
| 8.11 (59)
| Lake Oval
| 9,307
| 28 August 1971
|- bgcolor="#FFFFFF"
| | 16.14 (110)'| 
| 14.18 (102)
| MCG
| 36,423
| 28 August 1971

Ladder

Consolation Night Series Competition
The consolation night series were held under the floodlights at Lake Oval, South Melbourne, for the teams (5th to 12th on ladder) out of the finals at the end of the home and away rounds.

Final: Melbourne 12.7 (79) defeated Fitzroy 9.9 (63).

Premiership Finals

First Semi-Final

Second Semi-Final

Preliminary Final

Grand final

Awards
 The 1971 VFL Premiership team was Hawthorn.
 The VFL's leading goalkicker was Peter Hudson of Hawthorn who kicked 150 goals (including 10 goals in the finals).
 The winner of the 1971 Brownlow Medal was Ian Stewart of Richmond with 21 votes.
 South Melbourne took the "wooden spoon" in 1971.
Richmond 14.14 (98) defeated  8.18 (66) in the Grand Final, held as a curtain-raiser to the seniors Grand Final at the Melbourne Cricket Ground on 25 September.

Leading Goalkickers
Numbers highlighted in blue indicates the player led the goalkicking at the end of that round.
DNP = did not play in that round.

Notable events
 Fitzroy winger Treva McGregor won the 1971, 130-yard Stawell Gift in 11.7 seconds, off a handicap of 7¼ yards.
 Bill Barrot of Richmond and Ian Stewart of St Kilda swap clubs before the start of the 1971 season. Stewart went on to win his third Brownlow Medal at Richmond, while Barrott was so dissatisfied at St Kilda's demands that he play in defence that he requested, and was given, a clearance to Carlton during the season.
 The VFL sold its Harrison House headquarters and moved to 84 Jolimont Street.
 In the Grand Final, Peter Hudson could have broken Bob Pratt's season record of 150 goals except for three incidents:
He kicked what would have otherwise been an easy goal into the man on the mark (Barry Lawrence).
He kicked a goal on the run that was disallowed because the end of the quarter siren had gone before the ball hit his boot.
He ran into an open goal and kicked the ball out of bounds.
 The Committees of the Carlton Football Club and Collingwood decide not to renew the contracts of their respective coaches, Ron Barassi and Bob Rose.

References

 Maplestone, M., Flying Higher: History of the Essendon Football Club 1872–1996, Essendon Football Club, (Melbourne), 1996. 
 Rogers, S. & Brown, A., Every Game Ever Played: VFL/AFL Results 1897–1997 (Sixth Edition), Viking Books, (Ringwood), 1998. 
 Ross, J. (ed), 100 Years of Australian Football 1897–1996: The Complete Story of the AFL, All the Big Stories, All the Great Pictures, All the Champions, Every AFL Season Reported'', Viking, (Ringwood), 1996.

External links
 1971 Season – AFL Tables

Australian Football League seasons
VFL season